Army of Africa may refer to:

Army of Africa (France)
Army of Africa (Spain)
Panzer Army Africa